Mind Control is a song written and recorded by the American rock band Tantric. The song was released June 16, 2009 as the lead single from their fourth studio album of the same name (Mind Control).

Charts

Tantric (band) songs
2009 singles
2009 songs
Songs written by Hugo Ferreira